Algiz (also Elhaz) is the name conventionally given to the "z-rune"  of the Elder Futhark runic alphabet. Its transliteration is z, understood as a phoneme of the Proto-Germanic language, the terminal *z continuing Proto-Indo-European terminal *s.

It is one of two runes which express a phoneme that does not occur word-initially, and thus could not be named acrophonically, the other being the ŋ-rune Ingwaz . As the terminal *-z phoneme marks the nominative singular suffix of masculine nouns, the rune occurs comparatively frequently in early epigraphy.

Because this specific phoneme was lost at an early time, the Elder Futhark rune underwent changes in the medieval runic alphabets. In the Anglo-Saxon futhorc it retained its shape, but it was given the sound value of Latin x. This is a secondary development, possibly due to runic manuscript tradition, and there is no known instance of the rune being used in an Old English inscription.

In Proto-Norse and Old Norse, the Germanic *z phoneme developed into an R sound, perhaps realized as a retroflex approximant , which is usually transcribed as ʀ. This sound was written in the Younger Futhark using the Yr rune , the Algiz rune turned upside down, from about the 7th century. This phoneme eventually became indistinguishable from the regular r sound in the later stages of Old Norse, at about the 11th or 12th century.

The shape of the rune may be derived from that a letter expressing /x/ in certain Old Italic alphabets, which was in turn derived from the Greek letter Ψ which had the value of /kʰ/ (rather than /ps/) in the Western Greek alphabet.

Name
The Elder Futhark rune  is conventionally called Algiz or Elhaz, from the Common Germanic word for "elk".

There is wide agreement that this is most likely not the historical name of the rune, but in the absence of any positive evidence of what the historical name may have been, the conventional name is simply based on a reading of the rune name in the Anglo-Saxon rune poem, first suggested by Wilhelm Grimm (Über deutsche Runen, 1821), as eolh or eolug "elk".

Like the ng-rune, the z-rune is a special case inasmuch as it could not have been named acrophonically, since the sound it represents did not occur in word-initial position. Choosing a name that terminates in -z would have been more or less arbitrary, as this was the nominative singular suffix of almost every masculine noun of the language. Since the name eolh, or more accurately eolh-secg "elk-sedge" in the Anglo-Saxon rune poem represents not the rune's original sound value, but rather the sound of Latin x (/ks/), it becomes highly arbitrary to suggest that the original rune should have been named after the elk.

There are a number of speculative suggestions surrounding the history of the rune's name. The difficulty lies in the circumstance that the Younger Futhark rune did not inherit this name at all, but acquired the name of the obsolete Eihwaz rune, as yr. The only independent evidence of the Elder Futhark rune's name would be the name of the corresponding Gothic letter, ezec. The Gothic letter was an adoption of Greek Zeta, and while it did express the /z/ phoneme, this Gothic sound only rarely occurred terminally. Instead, it is found mostly in positions where West and North Germanic have r, e.g. Gothic máiza "greater" (Old Norse meira, English more).

The name of the Anglo-Saxon rune  is variously recorded as eolx, eolhx, ilcs, ilx, iolx, ilix, elux.

Manuscript tradition gives its sound value as Latin x, i.e. /ks/, or alternatively as il, or yet again as "l and x". The reading of this opaque name as eolh "elk" is entirely due to the reading of the Anglo-Saxon rune poem's  secg as eolh-secg (eolx-secg, eolug-secg, eolxecg) "elk-sedge", apparently the name of a species of sedge (Carex). This reading of the poem is due to Wilhelm Grimm (1821), and remains standard. The suggestion is that this compound is realized as eolk-secg, thus containing the Latin x (/ks/) sound sequence. The manuscript testimony that the rune is to be read as il would then be simply a mistaken assumption that its name must be acrophonic.

The name of the corresponding Gothic letter ezec, however, suggests that the old name of this rune was not just eolx, but the full eolh-secg. This is puzzling, because the sound value of the rune was clearly not /ks/ in the Elder Futhark period (2nd to 4th centuries). Furthermore, the name of the sedge in question is recorded in the older Epinal-Erfurt glossary as ilugsegg (glossing papiluus, probably for papyrus), which cannot be derived from the word for elk.

A suggestion by Warren and Elliott takes the Old English eolh at face value, and reconstructs a Common Germanic form of either *algiz or *alhiz. They cite a "more fanciful school" which assumes an original meaning of "elk" based on a theonym Alcis recorded by Tacitus (suggesting that the name would have been theophoric in origin, referring to an "elk-god"). The authors dismiss the Old English "elk-sedge" as a late attempt to give the then-obsolete rune a value of Latin x. Instead, they suggest that the original name of the rune could have been Common Germanic *algiz ('Algie'), meaning not "elk" but "protection, defence".

Redbond (1936) suggested that the eolhx (etc.) may have been a corruption of helix. Seebold (1991) took this up to suggest that the name of the rune may be connected to the use of elux for helix by Notker to describe the constellation of Ursa major (as turning around the celestial pole).

An earlier suggestion is that of Zacher (1855), to the effect that the earliest value of this rune was the labiovelar /hw/, and that its name may have been hweol "wheel".

Elder Futhark

In the Elder Futhark, Algiz represents the Germanic phoneme *z, which does not occur word-initially.

It is attested in final position in the earliest inscriptions, e.g. in ansuz (Vimose buckle), þewaz (Thorsberg chape). It was presumably present in the Ovre Stabu spearhead inscription (ca. AD 180), reading raunija[z], but is hardly legible now. The Nydam axe-handle (4th century) has the name wagagastiz. The Golden Horns of Gallehus (early 5th century) had the personal name hlewagastiz holtijaz.

In the earliest inscriptions, the rune invariably has its standard Ψ-shape. From the 5th century or so, the rune appears optionally in its upside-down variant which would become the standard Younger Futhark yr shape. There are also other graphical variants; for example, the Charnay Fibula has a superposition of these two variants, resulting in an "asterisk" shape.

Anglo-Saxon futhorc
The name of the Anglo-Saxon rune  is variously recorded as eolx, ilcs, ilix, elux, eolhx. Manuscript tradition gives its sound value as Latin x, i.e. /ks/, or alternatively as il, or yet again as "l and x". The relevant stanza of the Anglo-Saxon rune poem reads:
 sec[g e]ard hæfþ oftust on fenne
ƿexeð on ƿature, ƿundaþ grimme
blode breneð beorna gehƿylcne
ðe him ænigne onfeng gedeþ.
Reading the rune as eolhx (as discussed above), and with the emendation of seccard to secg eard due to Grimm (1821), the stanza becomes about a species of sedge (Cladium mariscus) called "elk-sedge". In the translation of Page (1999):
The Elk-sedge usually lives in the fen,
growing in the water. It wounds severely,
staining with blood any man
who makes a grab at it.

The 9th-century abecedarium anguliscum in Codex Sangallensis 878 shows eolh as a peculiar shape, as it were a bindrune of the older  with the Younger Futhark , resulting in an "asterisk" shape similar to ior .

The only known instance where the rune does take the sound value of Latin x in epigraphy is the spelling of rex "king" on the interlace coin dies of king Beonna (mid 8th century). Furthermore, it appears in the inscription on St Cuthbert's coffin (late 7th century) in the abbreviation of the name Christ, where Greek ΧΡϹ is taken as Latin xps and rendered as runic .

Younger Futhark

In the 6th and 7th centuries, the Elder Futhark began to be replaced by the Younger Futhark in Scandinavia. By the 8th century, the Elder Futhark was extinct, and Scandinavian runic inscriptions were exclusively written in Younger Futhark.

The Yr rune  is a rune of the Younger Futhark. Its common transliteration is a small capital ʀ. The shape of the Yr rune in the Younger Futhark is the inverted shape of the Elder Futhark rune. Its name yr ("yew") is taken from the name of the Elder Futhark Eihwaz rune.

Its phonological value is the continuation of the phoneme represented by Algiz, the word-final *-z in Proto Germanic.

Unicode has "Latin Small Capital Letter R" at code point U+0280 ʀ (IPA’s symbol for the uvular trill). A corresponding capital letter is at U+01A6 Ʀ, called "Latin Letter Yr". The rune itself is encoded at U+16E6  "Long Branch Yr". Variants are "Short Twig Yr" at U+16E7  and "Icelandic Yr" at U+16E8 .

The Anglo-Saxon calc rune ᛣ has the same shape as Younger Futhark yr, but is unrelated in origin (being a modification or "doubling" of cen ᚳ).

Independently, the shape of the Elder Futhark Algiz rune reappears in the Younger Futhark Maðr rune , continuing the Elder Futhark  rune *Mannaz.

Modern usage

"Life rune" and "Death rune"

The Man and Yr runes in Guido von List's Armanen Futharkh were based on the Younger Futhark. List's runes were later adopted and modified by Karl Maria Wiligut who was responsible for their adoptions in Nazi occultism. Both List and Wiligut have an "Yr" rune of the same shape as the Younger Futhark Yr rune.

In this context, the Man rune (identical in shape to the Elder Futhark Algiz) came to be understood in the Germanic mysticism of the early 20th century as symbolizing "life" and called the "life rune".

The Yr rune came to be seen as the "life rune" inverted and interpreted as "death rune" During the World War II era, these two runes ( for "born",  for "died") came to be used in obituaries and on tomb stones as marking birth and death dates, replacing asterisk and cross symbols (* for "born", † for "died") conventionally used in this context in Germany. It has always been clear that this association is an innovation of modern esotericism, without direct precedent in the medieval usage of the Younger Futhark alphabet. This fact was pointed out in an article in the German journal Stimmen der Zeit as early as in 1940.

After 1945, the term "life rune" continued to be used as völkisch nationalism. Contemporary examples include use by the American National Alliance (as of 2007), and in reference to the Algiz rune in the logo of the Flemish nationalist  as levensrune (as of 2016).

The term "death rune" has been used in the context of esotericist or occultist aesthetics associated with black metal, in the name of Deathrune Records (as of 2011), formerly  Records, a minor black metal record label.

Pop culture
Following Ralph Blum (1982), the Algiz rune is given a sense of "protection" in some modern systems of runic divination.
Blum (1982) himself glosses for Algiz with "Protection; Sedge or Rushes; An Elk".

See also
Elder Futhark
Younger Futhark

Notes

References

 Dobbie, Elliott Van Kirk (1942). The Anglo-Saxon Minor Poems. Columbia University Press. .
 Page, R. I. (1999). An Introduction to English Runes. Boydell Press, page 71. .

Runes